Wheelock is a fire alarm and general signaling products manufacturer owned by Eaton Corporation.

History

Some of the earliest signals produced by Wheelock were the A-1 series of AC-powered, dual-projector electromechanical horns. In the early 1970s, Wheelock introduced the 31 (AC-powered) and 34 (DC-powered) series of electromechanical horns. Around 1976, Wheelock created the 7001 (2-wire, flush-mount DC), 7002 (2-wire, surface-mount DC), 34+WS (4-wire, surface-mount DC), and 7004 (2-wire, surface-mount AC) electromechanical horn/strobes. These were the first fire alarm signals to use xenon strobes instead of incandescent lights.  The signals either had pigtail connectors or screw terminals for power-up.  Models with screw terminals had the letter "T" in their model numbers (e.g. 34T, 7002T).  The horn and strobe on the 7001 and 7002 models are wired in series, causing the horn to produce a distinctive "skipping" sound when the strobe flashes. In late 1984, Wheelock redesigned the horn's grilles, making them vandal resistant; and shortly thereafter, pigtail wires were discontinued. This product line became extremely popular among third-party security companies, such as Honeywell, Ademco, and Cerberus Pyrotronics (now part of Siemens AG). In 1994, Wheelock discontinued this series, because their low-intensity strobes did not meet the new light distribution requirements of the ADA. The replacement was the MT series. The 31T is still in production today for general signaling purposes. (The red 31T 115 does fit all the requirements for a Fire Alarm signal, however, and can be placed on a strobe plate without issue.) 

In March, 2006, Wheelock, Inc was acquired by Cooper Industries.

Cooper Wheelock also produces several bells as well as speakers, synchronization modules, booster power supplies, chimes and voice evacuation products. Cooper Wheelock does not manufacture fire alarm control panels, smoke detectors, or heat detectors. However, many fire alarm control panels are compatible with Cooper Wheelock's line of notification appliances and other products. Wheelock also produces notification devices for Siemens Building Technologies for its fire alarm systems such as the Cerberus Pro Modular. These notification devices manufactured for Siemens are the same device, but with major tweaks to the syncing (possibly to allow for older Siemens devices, like the U-MCS series for example, to be on the same notification appliance circuit), and rebranding devices. A few examples of some products Wheelock makes for Siemens include the Z-Series (ZR and ZN series), E series (SE, SEH, SEF and SEFH series), the LED3 series (SL Series), and more, with the exception of the Exceeder Xenon (ST, HS, HN series).

Products

Series MT 

The Series MT (Multi-tone) was introduced in 1993. It features eight different tones including Continuous Horn, Code-3 Horn, March Time Horn, Code-3 Tone, Siren, Slow Whoop, Hi-Lo, and Bell. These could be set using DIP switches on the back of the horn. However, most of the tones did not grab the attention of bystanders. The most commonly used tones were Continuous Horn, Code-3 Horn, and March Time Horn. The MT has seen different strobe types over time, including translucent vertical strobes, transparent vertical strobes, and transparent horizontal strobes. The horizontal strobe design was introduced in 2002, and is still used to this day.

Series AS 
In 1995, Wheelock introduced the AS, a combination horn and strobe. The AS was first created with a vertical position strobe on the right side of the horn, except for 110 candela models, which used a horizontal strobe. In 1998 when the NS was introduced, the strobe on all AS models was moved above the horn horizontally regardless of how many candelas it is, like most other current Wheelock strobes for better light output; additionally, a Code 3 horn was added to the AS during the 1998 update. In March 2010, the AS was discontinued, but its weatherproof variant (ASWP) is still being manufactured as of 2021.

Series NS 
In 1998, Wheelock released the NS series. The NS is similar to the AS, except the design is much less boxy, and the piezoelectric speaker disc is slightly visible through the grill which also has an updated horn. It uses a strobe similar to the RSS line. This series has been discontinued since March 2010, and has been replaced by the Exceder series.

Series RSS 
The RSS strobe replaced the vertical LSM, RS and Syncable SR strobe series, since a horizontal strobe allows for greater coverage. They also introduced the RSSP, a retrofit plate which allows the easy addition of a strobe to older electromechanical horns and bells.

On June 25, 2021, Eaton announced that they would discontinute the indoor RSS series. It was discontinued on December 31, 2021.

Series E

Z-Series 

In 2006, Wheelock introduced the ZNS, ZRS, and ZNH horn/strobes, remote strobes, and remote horns. The ZNS has the same horn circuitry as the NS. The ZNS and ZRS features a "snap-on" mounting system, which allows the base to be installed before the horn is attached. The Z-series has been discontinued since March 2010, with its successor being the Exceeder. However, this lineup is still being produced exclusively for Siemens AG, under the ZR and ZN series.

Exceder 
Wheelock introduced the Exceder series in 2008, consisting of horn/strobes, remote strobes, and remote horns. This product line is essentially a style update of the ZNS. This alarm also features the same "snap-on" mounting system as the ZNS.

Exceeder LED 

In 2012, Wheelock updated their Exceder LED series by introducing the industry's first LED notification appliances. The strobes, horns, and horn strobes have compact design, that can be mounted on a single gang electrical backbox, or a trim plate to mount on a dual gang or 4" inch electrical backbox. However it does not feature a "snap-on" mounting system because of the small size of the device. The horn sounds similar to the Exceder's horn. In 2013 Wheelock began making the Exceder LED speaker strobes and the Exceder LED ceiling mount version.

Eluxa (EL) 
In 2020, Wheelock announced a new family of notification appliances, named "Eluxa", which shared a similar design from the Exceder LED and LED3 series, however, the notification appliances had their design altered to accommodate a larger LED module, which was engineered to offer strobe intensity ratings of 15, 30, 75, 110, 135, and 185 candela for the wall models, and 15, 30, 75, 110, 150 and 177 for the ceiling mount models, as well as notification appliances being re-engineered to include a mounting plate, like the Exceder Xenon and ZNS/ZRS (ZR/ZH for Siemens). Types of devices include horns, horn strobes, strobes, low frequency sounder strobes, low frequency sounders, speaker strobes and speakers.

References

External links
 Cooper Wheelock
 Cooper Wheelock Products
Eaton - Alarms & Signaling Devices

Manufacturing companies established in 1922
Fire detection and alarm companies
1922 establishments in New Jersey
2006 mergers and acquisitions
